Psococerastis gibbosa is a species of Psocoptera from the Psocidae family that can be found in Great Britain and Ireland. They are also common in Austria, Benelux, Bulgaria, Croatia, Finland, France, Germany, Hungary, Italy, Latvia, Poland, Romania, Spain, Switzerland, and Scandinavia. The species are yellowish-black coloured, and are striped.

Habitat
The species feeds on ash, beech, birch, blackthorn, elder, hawthorn, hazel, larch, oak, pine, and sallow. They sometimes eat apples.

References

Psocidae
Insects described in 1776
Psocoptera of Europe
Taxa named by Johann Heinrich Sulzer